Malmaliya is a village in Siwan district, Bihar, India. It belongs to Kauriya panchayat.

This village has the biggest temple after the Hanuman Mandir of Patna  named "Hanuman Gadhi Mandir" in Bihar. This place is known for  "Ox fare" which was started around 40 years ago. Which is named Shree Durga moves mela. A railway will connect to Mashrakh and Siwan. A railway station is planned, very close to Hanuman Mandir at the confluence of two highways.

Malmaliya has a bus station where passengers can get buses to elsewhere in Bihar as well as other major cities like Delhi, Lucknow, Gorakhpur, Varanasi, Ranchi, Jaipur, Surat, Kolkata, or Siliguri. Malmalia is a crowded place and well known for exporting fruits like mango and  banana. Uttar Bihar Gramin Bank, is the main financial service provider of this area.

References 

Villages in Siwan district